Maang (autonym:  or ) or Mo'ang is a Lolo-Burmese language of Wenshan Prefecture, Yunnan, China and northern Vietnam. The Maang are also locally referred to as the Gāokùjiǎo Yí (高裤脚彝; "High-Trousered Yi") by other local ethnic groups (Zhou 2014:1).

Lama (2012) classifies Maang within the Mondzish branch of Lolo–Burmese. Maang has many Zhuang (Central Tai) loanwords (Wang 2018).

Distribution
Zhou (2014:1-2) reports that Mo'ang is spoken in the following villages.

Banlun township 板仑乡, Funing County, Yunnan
Longyang 龙洋 (Maang, Zhuang, and Han Chinese residents)
Longmai 龙迈
Mula 木腊 (Maang, Zhuang, and Han Chinese residents)
Gongjinwei 公金渭
Kela 克拉
Mugan 木甘, Niuchang village 牛场村, Lida town 里达镇 (Maang, Zhuang residents)
Muxiongping village 木兄坪村, Muyang town 木央镇
Zhilun 直伦 (Maang and Miao residents)
Upper Muyang 上木羊 (Maang and Miao residents)
Lower Muyang 下木羊 (Maang and Miao residents)
Xiaomulun 小睦伦, Muyang town 木央镇 (Han Chinese, Maang, and Yao residents)
Ligong 里拱, Lida town 里达镇, Funing County, Yunnan (also 12 other villages in Lida town 里达镇)
The villages of Zhechang 者长, Dana 达那, Nianbi 念必 in Napo County, Guangxi province

There are 713 households and 4,079 individuals according to a 2003 estimate by the Funing County government (Zhou 2014:1).

References

Hsiu, Andrew. 2014. "Mondzish: a new subgroup of Lolo-Burmese". In Proceedings of the 14th International Symposium on Chinese Languages and Linguistics (IsCLL-14). Taipei: Academia Sinica.
Hsiu, Andrew. 2017. Meang audio word list. Zenodo. 
Lama, Ziwo Qiu-Fuyuan (2012), Subgrouping of Nisoic (Yi) Languages, thesis, University of Texas at Arlington (archived)
Wang, Zhanling 王战领. 2018. Mo'angyu de xishu ji qi yuyan jiechu 末昂语的系属及其语言接触. Journal of Honghe University 期红河学院学报, Vol.16　No.2, Apr. 2018. 
Wu, Zili [武自立]. 1993. A preliminary study of the Mo'ang language of Funing County, Yunnan Province [云南富宁未昂话初探]. Minzu Yuwen 2. http://wuxizazhi.cnki.net/Search/MZYW199302009.html
Zhou, Decai [周德才]. 2014. A study of Mo'ang [末昂语研究]. Beijing: Ethnic Publishing House [民族出版社].

External links
Mo'ang numerals

Mondzish languages